Emanuel Neto (born 1984 in Luanda, Angola) is a 6'9" basketball center who attended Stony Brook University from 2006-07 after transferring from San Jacinto College. Neto was also a member of the Angola national basketball team which ranked 10th in the 2006 FIBA World Championship. During the 2006-2007 season for Stony Brook, Neto's first, he averaged 4.8 points per game and 5.6 rebounds. He had a career high in both points and rebounds on January 25, 2007. On that day against the University of Maine, Neto scored 13 points and grabbed 16 rebounds in 23 minutes while his squad lost 74-66.

2008 Summer Olympics
Neto was invited to join the Angolan national team for the 2008 Summer Olympics in Beijing, accepted the invitation, but was "banned" by the Republic of China, from participating in the summer Olympic games in Beijing, consequence of his very active role in the fight for peace in Sudan(Darfur), and involvement with Team Darfur.

References

External links
 2004 article on Neto's arrival at San Jacinto
 "Men's Basketball Adds Three Student-Athletes To Class of 2010"
 Emanuel Neto player card @ ESPN.com

1984 births
Living people
2006 FIBA World Championship players
Angolan expatriate basketball people in the United States
Angolan men's basketball players
Centers (basketball)
San Jacinto Central Ravens men's basketball players
Basketball players from Luanda
Stony Brook Seawolves men's basketball players